The Parliamentary Under-Secretary of State for Scotland is a junior ministerial post (of Parliamentary Under-Secretary of State rank) in the Government of the United Kingdom, supporting the Secretary of State for Scotland. The post is also known as Deputy Secretary of State for Scotland.

The post was first established as the Parliamentary Under-Secretary for Health for Scotland in 1919, before becoming the Parliamentary Under-Secretary of State for Scotland in 1926. Additional Parliamentary Under-Secretary posts were added in 1940 and 1951, and a Minister of State post was established in 1951. In 1969–70, one of the Under-Secretary posts was replaced by an additional Minister of State. From 1974 to 1979, there were two Ministers of State and three Under-Secretaries, reverting to one Minister of State in 1979. In 1997, the second Minister of State post was reinstated, and a fourth Under-Secretary post was briefly added from August 1998.

Following devolution in 1999, the number of ministers was reduced. There are currently two Under-Secretaries to support the Secretary of State, and there is no Minister of State.

Parliamentary Under-Secretary for Health for Scotland (1919–1926)

Parliamentary Under-Secretary of State for Scotland (1926–present)

Minister of State for Scotland (1951–2008)
 2 November 1951: The Earl of Home
 7 April 1955: Thomas Galbraith
 23 October 1958: The Lord Forbes
 22 October 1959: Jack Nixon Browne
 20 October 1964: George Willis 
 7 January 1967: Dickson Mabon (to 19 June 1970)
 13 October 1969: The Lord Hughes (to 19 June 1970)
 23 June 1970: The Lady Tweedsmuir
 7 April 1972: The Lord Polwarth
 8 March 1974: Bruce Millan (to 8 April 1976)
 8 March 1974: The Lord Hughes (to 8 August 1975)
 8 August 1975: The Lord Kirkhill (to 15 December 1978)
 14 April 1976: Gregor Mackenzie (to 4 May 1979)
 7 May 1979: The Earl of Mansfield
 13 June 1983: The Lord Gray of Contin
 10 September 1986: The Lord Glenarthur
 13 June 1987: Ian Lang (to 28 November 1990)
 13 June 1987: The Lord Sanderson of Bowden (to 7 September 1990)
 7 September 1990: Michael Forsyth
 14 April 1992: The Lord Fraser of Carmyllie
 6 July 1995: Lord James Douglas-Hamilton
 6 May 1997: Henry McLeish (to 29 June 1999)
 6 May 1997: Brian Wilson (to 28 July 1998)
 28 July 1998: Helen Liddell (to 17 May 1999)
 29 July 1999: Brian Wilson
 26 January 2001: George Foulkes (to 29 May 2002)
 July 2007: David Cairns (16 September 2008)

See also
 Deputy First Minister of Scotland

References

External links
Scotland Office

Lists of government ministers of Scotland
Government of Scotland
Political office-holders in Scotland